Three naval battles were fought off the promontory of Beachy Head on the Sussex coast of England.

 The third day of fighting in the Battle of Portland, 1653, during the First Anglo-Dutch War, took place off Beachy Head between the fleets of the Commonwealth of England and the United Provinces.
 The Battle of Beachy Head (1690), during the War of the Grand Alliance, was fought between an Anglo-Dutch fleet and a French fleet.
 The Battle of Beachy Head (1707), during the War of the Spanish Succession, was a victory for the French fleet over a British convoy of 52 transports escorted by 3 English ships of the line.